Darayan I (also spelled Darew I, Darev I and Darius I; Aramaic: 𐡃𐡀𐡓𐡉𐡅 d’ryw) was the first king of Persis, most likely invested with kingship of the region by his overlord, the Parthian monarch Phraates II sometime after 132 BC.

Although Darayan I's name was usually read as "Darew" by numismatics, an engraving of his name on a silver bowl has led to his name being read as "Darayan" by most recent studies. The name is derived from Old Persian daraya-vahauš, the name of the prominent Achaemenid King of Kings Darius the Great. Darayan I, unlike his predecessors—the fratarakas—used the title of shah ("king"), and laid foundations to a new dynasty, which may be labelled the Darayanids. The title for "king" he uses on his coinage is malik, whilst the legend on the reverse is d’ryw mlk’ ("Darius the King"). The reason behind his adoption of the title of Darayan was seemingly because he felt strong enough to do so, and in spite of the difficulties that he and his successors faced, they did not renounce the title until the fall of the kingdom.

The style of the silver drachmas under Darayan I was a continual of the one under the fratarakas. On the obverse, the king is wearing a soft cap (bashlyk) with a crescent. On the reverse, the king is facing a fire temple with the Zoroastrian supreme deity Ahura Mazda above, and holding a scepter, and on the other side of the temple an eagle mounted on a pedestal. The reverse has an inscription in the Aramaic script: 𐡃𐡀𐡓𐡉𐡅 𐡌𐡋𐡊 d’ryw mlk’ ("Darius the King"). Parthian influence was notable on the coinage of Darayan I and his successors. Darayan I was succeeded by Wadfradad III.

Notes

References

Sources 

 .
 
  
 
 
 
 

2nd-century BC Iranian people
History of Fars Province
2nd-century BC rulers in Asia
Kings of Persis